The Starless World is a science fiction novel by American writer Gordon Eklund, set in the Star Trek universe and involving a Dyson Sphere. It contains the canonical character James T. Kirk. It was originally published by Bantam Books in 1978.

Plot summary
The Enterprise is sent to investigate Klingon activity in the galactic core. They encounter a shuttlecraft piloted by Thomas Clayton, from the long-lost ship, the USS Rickover. Clayton is also an old friend of Kirk's, a former roommate from his time at Starfleet Academy.

Kirk is prepared to dismiss his unfortunate friend as a madman until a mysterious force seizes control of the ship. Clayton declares the Enterprise is now going to meet his new god.

References

External links

1978 American novels
1978 science fiction novels
American science fiction novels
Bantam Books books
Novels based on Star Trek: The Original Series